This article contains a list of ants of Thailand from Khachonpisitsak et al. (2020).

Khachonpisitsak et al. (2020) report 529 ant species and subspecies in 109 genera for Thailand. These belong to 10 different subfamilies. Thailand is the type locality for 81 species.

An earlier comprehensive checklist of ant species of Thailand can be found in Jaitrong & Nabhitabhata (2005).

List of species

Subfamily Amblyoponinae
Subfamily Amblyoponinae [5 genera, 8 species]
Myopopone
Myopopone castanea (Smith, 1860)
Mystrium
Mystrium camillae Emery, 1889
Prionopelta
Prionopelta kraepelini Forel, 1905
Stigmatomma
Stigmatomma crenatum (Xu, 2001)
Stigmatomma quadratum Karavaiev, 1935
Stigmatomma reclinatum (Mayr, 1879)
Stigmatomma rothneyi (Forel, 1900)
Xymmer
Xymmer phungi Satria, Sasaki, Bui, Oguri, Syoji, Fisher, Yamane & Eguchi, 2016

Subfamily Dolichoderinae

Subfamily Dolichoderinae [7 genera, 35 species]
Dolichoderus
Dolichoderus affinis Emery, 1889
Dolichoderus beccarii Emery, 1887
Dolichoderus butteli Forel, 1913
Dolichoderus cuspidatus (Smith, 1857)
Dolichoderus erectilobus Santschi, 1920
Dolichoderus feae Emery, 1889
Dolichoderus laotius Santschi, 1920
Dolichoderus semirugosus (Mayr, 1870)
Dolichoderus siggii Forel, 1895
Dolichoderus sulcaticeps (Mayr, 1870)
Dolichoderus taprobanae (Smith, 1858)
Dolichoderus taprobanae siamensis Forel, 1911
Dolichoderus thoracicus (Smith, 1860)
Iridomyrmex
Iridomyrmex anceps (Roger, 1863)
Ochetellus
Ochetellus glaber (Mayr, 1862)
Philidris
Philidris cordata (Smith, 1859)
Philidris myrmecodiae (Emery, 1887)
Tapinoma
Tapinoma indicum Forel, 1895
Tapinoma melanocephalum (Fabricius, 1793)
Technomyrmex
Technomyrmex albipes (Smith, 1861)
Technomyrmex butteli Forel, 1913
Technomyrmex brunneus Forel, 1895
Technomyrmex difficilis Forel, 1892
Technomyrmex elatior Forel, 1902
Technomyrmex grandis Emery, 1887
Technomyrmex horni Forel, 1912
Technomyrmex kraepelini Forel, 1905
Technomyrmex lisae Forel, 1913
Technomyrmex modiglianii Emery, 1900
Technomyrmex obscurior Wheeler, 1928
Technomyrmex pratensis (Smith, 1860)
Technomyrmex reductus Bolton, 2007
Technomyrmex strenuus Mayr, 1872
Technomyrmex vitiensis Mann, 1921
Technomyrmex yamanei Bolton, 2007

Subfamily Dorylinae

Subfamily Dorylinae [12 genera, 52 species]
Aenictus
Aenictus artipus Wilson, 1964
Aenictus binghamii Forel, 1900
Aenictus brevipodus Jaitrong & Yamane, 2013
Aenictus camposi Wheeler & Chapman, 1925
Aenictus changmaianus Terayama & Kubota, 1993
Aenictus concavus Jaitrong & Yamane, 2013
Aenictus cornutus Forel, 1900
Aenictus cylindripetiolus Jaitrong & Yamane, 2013
Aenictus dentatus Forel, 1911
Aenictus doydeei Jaitrong & Yamane, 2011
Aenictus duengkaei Jaitrong & Yamane, 2012
Aenictus fuchuanensis Zhou, 2001
Aenictus fulvus Jaitrong & Yamane, 2011
Aenictus gracilis Emery, 1893
Aenictus hodgsoni Forel, 1901
Aenictus hottai Terayama & Yamane, 1989
Aenictus jarujini Jaitrong & Yamane, 2010
Aenictus khaoyaiensis Jaitrong & Yamane, 2013
Aenictus laeviceps (Smith, 1857)
Aenictus leptotyphlatta Jaitrong & Eguchi, 2010
Aenictus longinodus Jaitrong & Yamane, 2012
Aenictus maneerati Jaitrong & Yamane, 2013
Aenictus minutulus Terayama & Yamane, 1989
Aenictus nishimurai Terayama & Kubota, 1993
Aenictus nuchiti Jaitrong & Ruangsittichai, 2018
Aenictus paradentatus Jaitrong & Yamane, 2012
Aenictus parahuonicus Jaitrong & Yamane, 2011
Aenictus peguensis Emery, 1895
Aenictus pinkaewi Jaitrong & Yamane, 2013
Aenictus samungi Jaitrong & Ruangsittichai, 2018
Aenictus siamensis Jaitrong & Yamane, 2011
Aenictus sonchaengi Jaitrong & Yamane, 2011
Aenictus stenocephalus Jaitrong & Yamane, 2010
Aenictus thailandianus Terayama & Kubota, 1993
Aenictus vieti Jaitrong & Yamane, 2010
Aenictus watanasiti Jaitrong & Yamane, 2013
Aenictus wilaiae Jaitrong & Yamane, 2013
Aenictus wiwatwitayai Jaitrong & Yamane, 2013
Aenictus yamanei Wiwatwitaya & Jaitrong, 2011
Cerapachys
Cerapachys sulcinodis Emery, 1889
Chrysapace
Chrysapace costatus (Bharti & Wachkoo, 2013)
Dorylus
Dorylus laevigatus (Smith, 1857)
Dorylus orientalis Westwood, 1835
Dorylus vishnui Wheeler, 1913
Eusphinctus
Eusphinctus furcatus Emery, 1893
Lioponera
Lioponera longitarsus Mayr, 1879
Parasyscia
Parasyscia dohertyi (Emery, 1902)
Simopone
Simopone oculata Radchenko, 1993
Syscia
Syscia chaladthanyakiji Jaitrong, Wiwatwitaya & Yamane, 2020
Syscia reticularis Jaitrong, Wiwatwitaya & Yamane, 2020
Yunodorylus
Yunodorylus sexspinus Xu, 2000
Zasphinctus
Zasphinctus siamensis (Jaitrong, 2016)

Subfamily Ectatomminae
Subfamily Ectatomminae [1 genus, 7 species]
Gnamptogenys
Gnamptogenys bicolor (Emery, 1889)
Gnamptogenys binghamii (Forel, 1900)
Gnamptogenys chapmani Brown, 1958
Gnamptogenys coxalis (Roger, 1860)
Gnamptogenys cribrata (Emery, 1900)
Gnamptogenys menadensis (Mayr, 1887)
Gnamptogenys ortostoma Lattke, 2004

Subfamily Formicinae

Subfamily Formicinae [19 genera, 133 species]
Acropyga
Acropyga acutiventris Roger, 1862
Acropyga butteli Forel, 1912
Anoplolepis
Anoplolepis gracilipes (Smith, 1857)
Camponotus
Camponotus angusticollis (Jerdon, 1851)
Camponotus arrogans (Smith, 1858)
Camponotus aureus Dumpert, 2006
Camponotus auriventris Emery, 1889
Camponotus camelinus (Smith, 1857)
Camponotus concurrens Zettel & Laciny, 2018
Camponotus dolichoderoides Forel, 1911
Camponotus exiguoguttatus Forel, 1886
Camponotus irritabilis (Smith, 1857)
Camponotus irritans (Smith, 1857)
Camponotus khaosokensis Dumpert, 2006
Camponotus lasiselene Wang & Wu, 1994
Camponotus mitis (Smith, 1858)
Camponotus mutilarius Emery, 1893
Camponotus nicobarensis Mayr, 1865
Camponotus oblongus (Smith, 1858)
Camponotus paraleonardi Zettel & Yamane, 2018
Camponotus parius Emery, 1889
Camponotus rufifemur Emery, 1900
Camponotus rufoglaucus (Jerdon, 1851)
Camponotus schoedli Dumpert, 2006
Camponotus schulzianus Zettel & Balàka, 2018
Camponotus sericeus (Fabricius, 1798)
Camponotus singularis (Smith, 1858)
Camponotus sophiae Zettel & Balàka, 2018
Camponotus weiserti Zettel & Laciny, 2018
Cladomyrma
Cladomyrma petalae Agosti, 1991
Cladomyrma sirindhornae Jaitrong, Laedprathom & Yamane, 2013
Colobopsis
Colobopsis badia (Smith, 1857)
Colobopsis cylindrica (Fabricius, 1798)
Colobopsis explodens Laciny & Zettel, 2018
Colobopsis leonardi (Emery, 1889)
Colobopsis markli Dumpert, 2004
Colobopsis saundersi (Emery, 1889)
Colobopsis vitrea (Smith, 1860)
Colobopsis vitrea praerufa (Emery, 1900)
Dinomyrmex
Dinomyrmex gigas (Latreille, 1802)
Echinopla
Echinopla charernsomi Tanansathaporn & Jaitrong, 2018
Echinopla cherapunjiensis Bharti & Gul, 2012
Echinopla fisheri Zettel & Laciny, 2015
Echinopla jeenthongi Tanansathaporn & Jaitrong, 2018
Echinopla lineata Mayr, 1862
Echinopla madli Zettel & Laciny, 2015
Echinopla melanarctos Smith, 1857
Echinopla pallipes Smith, 1857
Echinopla striata Smith, 1857
Echinopla tritschleri Forel, 1901
Echinopla tunkuabduljalilii Laciny, Zettel, Maryati & Noor–Izwan, 2019
Euprenolepis
Euprenolepis procera (Emery, 1900)
Euprenolepis wittei LaPolla, 2009
Lepisiota
Lepisiota watsonii (Forel, 1894)
Myrmoteras
Myrmoteras binghamii Forel, 1893
Myrmoteras concolor Bui, Eguchi & Yamane, 2013
Myrmoteras cuneonodus Xu, 1998
Myrmoteras jaitrongi Bui, Eguchi & Yamane, 2013
Myrmoteras opalinum Bui, Eguchi & Yamane, 2013
Myrmoteras tomimasai Bui, Eguchi & Yamane, 2013
Oecophylla
Oecophylla smaragdina (Fabricius, 1775)
Paraparatrechina
Paraparatrechina opaca (Emery, 1887)
Paratrechina
Paratrechina longicornis (Latreille, 1802)
Polyrhachis
Polyrhachis abdominalis Smith, 1858
Polyrhachis alatisquamis Forel, 1893
Polyrhachis arachne Emery, 1896
Polyrhachis arcuata (Le Guillou, 1842)
Polyrhachis armata (Le Guillou, 1842)
Polyrhachis bicolor Smith, 1858
Polyrhachis bihamata (Drury, 1773)
Polyrhachis boltoni Dorow & Kohout, 1995
Polyrhachis calypso Forel, 1911
Polyrhachis carbonaria Smith, 1857
Polyrhachis cephalotes Emery, 1893
Polyrhachis chalybea Smith, 1857
Polyrhachis craddocki Bingham, 1903
Polyrhachis cryptoceroides Emery, 1887
Polyrhachis dives Smith, 1857
Polyrhachis dolomedes Smith, 1863
Polyrhachis flavicornis Smith, 1857
Polyrhachis flavoflagellata Karavaiev, 1927
Polyrhachis fortis Emery, 1893
Polyrhachis furcata Smith, 1858
Polyrhachis halidayi Emery, 1889
Polyrhachis hauxwelli Bingham, 1903
Polyrhachis hector Smith, 1857
Polyrhachis hemiopticoides Mukerjee, 1930
Polyrhachis hippomanes Smith, 1861
Polyrhachis hodgsoni Forel, 1902
Polyrhachis illaudata Walker, 1859
Polyrhachis illaudata intermedia Forel, 1886
Polyrhachis inermis Smith, 1858
Polyrhachis javanica Mayr, 1867
Polyrhachis laevigata Smith, 1857
Polyrhachis laevissima Smith, 1858
Polyrhachis lama Kohout, 1994
Polyrhachis latona Wheeler, 1909
Polyrhachis mitrata Menozzi, 1932
Polyrhachis moesta Emery, 1887
Polyrhachis muelleri Forel, 1893
Polyrhachis nigropilosa Mayr, 1872
Polyrhachis noonananti Kohout, 2013
Polyrhachis ochracea Karavaiev, 1927
Polyrhachis olybria Forel, 1912
Polyrhachis phalerata Menozzi, 1926
Polyrhachis piliventris Smith, 1858
Polyrhachis proxima Roger, 1863
Polyrhachis pubescens Mayr, 1879
Polyrhachis rastellata (Latreille, 1802)
Polyrhachis rixosa Smith, 1858
Polyrhachis rufipes Smith, 1858
Polyrhachis saevissima kerri Forel, 1911
Polyrhachis sculpturata Smith, 1860
Polyrhachis sculpturata siamensis Mayr, 1879
Polyrhachis shixingensis Wu & Wang, 1995
Polyrhachis striata Mayr, 1862
Polyrhachis textor Smith, 1857
Polyrhachis thailandica Kohout, 2006
Polyrhachis thrinax Roger, 1863
Polyrhachis tibialis Smith, 1858
Polyrhachis varicolor Viehmeyer, 1916
Polyrhachis venus Forel, 1893
Polyrhachis villipes Smith, 1857
Polyrhachis watanasiti Kohout, 2013
Polyrhachis ypsilon Emery, 1887
Prenolepis
Prenolepis darlena Williams & LaPolla, 2016
Prenolepis fustinoda Williams & LaPolla, 2016
Prenolepis jacobsoni Crawley, 1923
Prenolepis jerdoni Emery, 1893
Prenolepis melanogaster Emery, 1893
Prenolepis naoroji Forel, 1902
Prenolepis shanialena Williams & LaPolla, 2016
Pseudolasius
Pseudolasius silvestrii Wheeler, 1927

Subfamily Amblyoponinae
Subfamily Leptanillinae [2 genera, 1 species]
Leptanilla
Leptanilla thai Baroni Urbani, 1977

Subfamily Myrmicinae

Subfamily Myrmicinae [40 genera, 216 species]
Acanthomyrmex
Acanthomyrmex ferox Emery, 1893
Acanthomyrmex malikuli Jaitrong & Asanok, 2019
Acanthomyrmex mizunoi Jaitrong & Asanok, 2019
Acanthomyrmex thailandensis Terayama, 1995
Anillomyrma
Anillomyrma decamera (Emery, 1901)
Calyptomyrmex
Calyptomyrmex beccarii Emery, 1887
Calyptomyrmex rectopilosus Dlussky & Radchenko, 1990
Cardiocondyla
Cardiocondyla emeryi Forel, 1881
Cardiocondyla itsukii Seifert, Okita & Heinze, 2017
Cardiocondyla kagutsuchi Terayama, 1999
Cardiocondyla wroughtonii (Forel, 1890)
Carebara
Carebara affinis (Jerdon, 1851)
Carebara castanea Smith, 1858
Carebara diversa (Jerdon, 1851)
Carebara lignata Westwood, 1840
Carebara pygmaea (Emery, 1887)
Carebara silenus (Smith, 1858)
Carebara trechideros (Zhou & Zheng, 1997)
Cataulacus
Cataulacus granulatus (Latreille, 1802)
Cataulacus horridus Smith, 1857
Cataulacus latus Forel, 1891
Cataulacus muticus Emery, 1889
Cataulacus praetextus Smith, 1867
Crematogaster
Crematogaster aberrans Forel, 1892
Crematogaster artifex Mayr, 1879
Crematogaster aurita Karavaiev, 1935
Crematogaster baduvi Forel, 1912
Crematogaster bandarensis Forel, 1913
Crematogaster binghamii Forel, 1904
Crematogaster bouvardi Santschi, 1920
Crematogaster coriaria Mayr, 1872
Crematogaster difformis Smith, 1857
Crematogaster dohrni Mayr, 1879
Crematogaster dohrni fabricans Forel, 1911
Crematogaster dohrni kerri Forel, 1911
Crematogaster dubia Karavaiev, 1935
Crematogaster ferrarii Emery, 1888
Crematogaster fraxatrix Forel, 1911
Crematogaster fumikoae Hosoishi & Ogata, 2015
Crematogaster hashimi Hosoishi, 2015
Crematogaster inflata Smith, 1857
Crematogaster longipilosa Forel, 1907
Crematogaster modiglianii Emery, 1900
Crematogaster onusta Stitz, 1925
Crematogaster physothorax Emery, 1889
Crematogaster pia Forel, 1911
Crematogaster quadriruga Forel, 1911
Crematogaster reticulata Hosoishi, 2009
Crematogaster rogenhoferi Mayr, 1879
Crematogaster rothneyi Mayr, 1879
Crematogaster sewardi Forel, 1901
Crematogaster treubi Emery, 1896: 246
Dacetinops
Dacetinops concinnus Taylor, 1965
Dilobocondyla
Dilobocondyla fouqueti Santschi, 1910
Epelysidris
Epelysidris brocha Bolton, 1987
Erromyrma
Erromyrma latinodis (Mayr, 1872)
Eurhopalothrix
Eurhopalothrix heliscata Wilson & Brown, 1985
Gauromyrmex
Gauromyrmex acanthinus (Karavaiev, 1935)
Kartidris
Kartidris matertera Bolton, 1991
Lasiomyrma
Lasiomyrma wiwatwitayai Jaitrong, 2010
Liomyrmex
Liomyrmex gestroi (Emery, 1887)
Lophomyrmex
Lophomyrmex bedoti Emery, 1893
Lophomyrmex birmanus Emery, 1893
Lophomyrmex lucidus Menozzi, 1930
Lophomyrmex striatulus Rigato, 1994
Mayriella
Mayriella transfuga Baroni Urbani, 1977
Meranoplus
Meranoplus bicolor (Guérin–Méneville, 1844)
Meranoplus castaneus Smith, 1857
Meranoplus laeviventris Emery, 1889
Meranoplus mucronatus Smith, 1857
Monomorium
Monomorium chinense Santschi, 1925
Monomorium floricola (Jerdon, 1851)
Monomorium pharaonis (Linnaeus, 1758)
Myrmecina
Myrmecina asiatica Okido, Ogata & Hosoishi, 2020
Myrmecina dechai Okido, Ogata & Hosoishi, 2020
Myrmecina inflata Okido, Ogata & Hosoishi, 2020
Myrmecina inthanonensis Okido, Ogata & Hosoishi, 2020
Myrmecina maryatiae Okido, Ogata & Hosoishi, 2020
Myrmecina raviwonghei Jaitrong, Samung, Waengsothorn & Okido, 2019
Myrmica
Myrmica ritae Emery, 1889
Myrmicaria
Myrmicaria arachnoides lutea Emery, 1900
Myrmicaria birmana Forel, 1902
Myrmicaria brunnea Saunders, 1842
Myrmicaria vidua Smith, 1858
Paratopula
Paratopula macta Bolton, 1988
Pheidole
Pheidole aglae Forel, 1913
Pheidole annexa Eguchi, 2001
Pheidole aristotelis Forel, 1911
Pheidole binghamii Forel, 1902
Pheidole bluntschlii Forel, 1911
Pheidole butteli Forel, 1913
Pheidole capellinii Emery, 1887
Pheidole cariniceps Eguchi, 2001
Pheidole clypeocornis Eguchi, 2001
Pheidole comata Smith, 1858
Pheidole dugasi Forel, 1911
Pheidole elongicephala Eguchi, 2008
Pheidole elisae Emery, 1900
Pheidole fervens Smith, 1858
Pheidole fortis Eguchi, 2006
Pheidole gatesi (Wheeler, 1927)
Pheidole hongkongensis Wheeler, 1928
Pheidole hortensis Forel, 1913
Pheidole huberi Forel, 1911
Pheidole inornata Eguchi, 2001
Pheidole inscrobiculata Viehmeyer, 1916
Pheidole jacobsoni Forel, 1911
Pheidole rugifera Eguchi, 2001
Pheidole magrettii Emery, 1887
Pheidole megacephala (Fabricius, 1793)
Pheidole nodgii Forel, 1905
Pheidole nodifera (Smith, 1858)
Pheidole nodus Smith, 1874
Pheidole parva Mayr, 1865
Pheidole pieli Santschi, 1925
Pheidole plagiaria Smith, 1860
Pheidole planifrons Santschi, 1920
Pheidole plinii Forel, 1911
Pheidole protea Forel, 1912
Pheidole quadricuspis Emery, 1900
Pheidole rabo Forel, 1913
Pheidole rinae Emery, 1900
Pheidole rugithorax Eguchi, 2008
Pheidole sarawakana Forel, 1911
Pheidole sauberi Forel, 1905
Pheidole singaporensis Özdikmen, 2010
Pheidole smythiesii Forel, 1902
Pheidole spathifera Forel, 1902
Pheidole taipoana Wheeler, 1928
Pheidole taivanensis Forel, 1912
Pheidole tandjongensis Forel, 1913
Pheidole tjibodana Forel, 1905
Pheidole tumida Eguchi, 2008
Pheidole vulgaris Eguchi, 2006
Pheidole yeensis Forel, 1902
Pheidole zoceana Santschi, 1925
Pristomyrmex
Pristomyrmex bicolor Emery, 1900
Pristomyrmex brevispinosus Emery, 1887
Pristomyrmex leleji Yamane & Dias, 2016
Pristomyrmex punctatus (Smith, 1860)
Pristomyrmex rigidus Wang, 2003
Pristomyrmex sulcatus Emery, 1895
Pristomyrmex trachylissus (Smith, 1858)
Proatta
Proatta butteli Forel, 1912
Recurvidris
Recurvidris browni Bolton, 1992
Recurvidris chanapaithooni Jaitrong & Wiwatwitaya, 2015
Recurvidris lekakuli Jaitrong, Tokeeree & Pitaktunsakul, 2019
Recurvidris recurvispinosa (Forel, 1890)
Rhopalomastix
Rhopalomastix javana Wheeler, 1929
Rhopalomastix johorensis Wheeler, 1929
Solenopsis
Solenopsis geminata (Fabricius, 1804)
Strumigenys
Strumigenys adiastola Bolton, 2000
Strumigenys amnesia Bolton, 2000
Strumigenys arges (Bolton, 2000)
Strumigenys atropos (Bolton, 2000)
Strumigenys benulia Bolton, 2000
Strumigenys brontes (Bolton, 2000)
Strumigenys caniophanes Bolton, 2000
Strumigenys confusatrix Bolton, 2000
Strumigenys dipsas Bolton, 2000
Strumigenys dohertyi Emery, 1897
Strumigenys doriae Emery, 1887
Strumigenys elegantula (Terayama & Kubota, 1989)
Strumigenys exilirhina Bolton, 2000
Strumigenys feae Emery, 1895
Strumigenys gnathosphax Bolton, 2000
Strumigenys kichijo (Terayama, Lin et Wu, 1996)
Strumigenys kraepelini Forel, 1905
Strumigenys mitis (Brown, 2000)
Strumigenys nanzanensis Lin & Wu, 1996
Strumigenys nepalensis De Andrade, 1994
Strumigenys nothomopyx Bolton, 2000
Strumigenys nytaxis Bolton, 2000
Strumigenys paraposta Bolton, 2000
Strumigenys rotogenys Bolton, 2000
Strumigenys sauteri (Forel, 1912)
Strumigenys scolopax (Bolton, 2000)
Strumigenys signeae Forel, 1905
Strumigenys strygax Bolton, 2000
Strumigenys sublaminata Brown, 1959
Strumigenys sydorata Bolton, 2000
Strumigenys taphra Bolton, 2000
Strumigenys tritomea Bolton, 2000
Syllophopsis
Syllophopsis australica (Forel, 1907)
Syllophopsis sechellensis (Emery, 1894)
Tetheamyrma
Tetheamyrma subspongia Bolton, 1991
Tetramorium
Tetramorium adelphon Bolton, 1979
Tetramorium aptum Bolton, 1977
Tetramorium bicarinatum (Nylander, 1846)
Tetramorium ciliatum Bolton, 1977
Tetramorium cuneinode Bolton, 1977
Tetramorium eleates Forel, 1913
Tetramorium flavipes Emery, 1893
Tetramorium hasinae Yamane & Jaitrong, 2011
Tetramorium indosinense Wheeler, 1927
Tetramorium insolens (Smith, 1861)
Tetramorium kheperra (Bolton, 1976)
Tetramorium lanuginosum Mayr, 1870
Tetramorium nacta (Bolton, 1976)
Tetramorium nipponense Wheeler, 1928
Tetramorium obtusidens Viehmeyer, 1916
Tetramorium pacificum Mayr, 1870
Tetramorium palaense Bolton, 1979
Tetramorium parvispinum (Emery, 1893)
Tetramorium parvum Bolton, 1977
Tetramorium polymorphum Yamane & Jaitrong, 2011
Tetramorium securis Roncin, 2002
Tetramorium seneb Bolton, 1977
Tetramorium simillimum (Smith, 1851)
Tetramorium smithi Mayr, 1879
Tetramorium walshi (Forel, 1890)
Tetramorium wroughtonii (Forel, 1902)
Trichomyrmex
Trichomyrmex destructor (Jerdon, 1851)
Vollenhovia
Vollenhovia emeryi Wheeler, 1906
Vollenhovia fridae Forel, 1913
Vollenhovia rufiventris Forel, 1901

Subfamily Ponerinae

Subfamily Ponerinae [19 genera, 56 species]
Anochetus
Anochetus graeffei Mayr, 1870
Anochetus modicus Brown, 1978
Anochetus myops Emery, 1893
Anochetus princeps Emery, 1884
Anochetus rugosus (Smith, 1857)
Brachyponera
Brachyponera chinensis (Emery, 1895) species complex
Brachyponera luteipes (Mayr, 1862)
Brachyponera nigrita (Emery, 1895)
Buniapone
Buniapone amblyops (Emery, 1887)
Centromyrmex
Centromyrmex feae (Emery, 1889)
Cryptopone
Cryptopone testacea Emery, 1893
Diacamma
Diacamma intricatum (Smith, 1857)
Diacamma jaitrongi Zettel, Pal & Laciny, 2016
Diacamma longitudinale Emery, 1889
Diacamma orbiculatum Santschi, 1932
Diacamma violaceum Forel, 1900
Ectomomyrmex
Ectomomyrmex annamitus (André, 1892)
Ectomomyrmex astutus (Smith, 1858)
Ectomomyrmex leeuwenhoeki (Forel, 1886)
Emeryopone
Emeryopone buttelreepeni Forel, 1912
Harpegnathos
Harpegnathos venator (Smith, 1858)
Leptogenys
Leptogenys aspera (André, 1889)
Leptogenys birmana Forel, 1900
Leptogenys borneensis Wheeler, 1919
Leptogenys cyanicatena Arimoto & Yamane, 2018
Leptogenys diminuta (Smith, 1857)
Leptogenys hysterica Forel, 1900
Leptogenys iridescens (Smith, 1857)
Leptogenys kitteli (Mayr, 1870)
Leptogenys kitteli altisquamis Forel, 1900
Leptogenys kraepelini Forel, 1905
Leptogenys lucidula Emery, 1895
Leptogenys mutabilis (Smith, 1861)
Leptogenys myops (Emery, 1887)
Leptogenys punctiventris (Mayr, 1879)
Mesoponera
Mesoponera rubra (Smith, 1857)
Myopias
Myopias bidens (Emery, 1900)
Myopias crawleyi (Donisthorpe, 1941)
Myopias maligna punctigera (Emery, 1900)
Myopias mandibularis (Crawley, 1924)
Myopias minima Jaitrong, Tasen & Guénard, 2018
Myopias sakaeratensis Jaitrong, Tasen & Guénard, 2018
Myopias sonthichaiae Jaitrong, Tasen & Guénard, 2018
Odontomachus
Odontomachus latidens Mayr, 1867
Odontomachus monticola Emery, 1892
Odontomachus rixosus Smith, 1857
Odontomachus simillimus Smith, 1858
Odontoponera denticulata (Smith, 1858)
Odontoponera transversa (Smith, 1857)
Parvaponera
Parvaponera darwinii (Forel, 1893)
Platythyrea
Platythyrea clypeata Forel, 1911
Platythyrea janyai Phengsi, Jaitrong, Ruangsittichai & Khachonpisitsak, 2018
Platythyrea parallela (Smith, 1859)
Platythyrea quadridenta Donisthorpe, 1941
Platythyrea tricuspidata Emery, 1900
Pseudoneoponera rufipes (Jerdon, 1851)

Subfamily Proceratiinae
Subfamily Proceratiinae [3 genera, 5 species]
Probolomyrmex
Probolomyrmex dammermani Wheeler, 1928
Probolomyrmex longinodus Terayama & Ogata, 1988
Probolomyrmex vieti Eguchi, Yoshimura et Yamane, 2006
Proceratium
Proceratium deelemani Perrault, 1981
Proceratium siamense de Andrade, 2003

Subfamily Pseudomyrmecinae

Subfamily Pseudomyrmecinae [1 genus, 16 species]
Tetraponera
Tetraponera aitkenii (Forel, 1902)
Tetraponera allaborans (Walker, 1859)
Tetraponera attenuata Smith, 1877
Tetraponera binghami (Forel, 1902)
Tetraponera concava Xu & Chai, 2004
Tetraponera connectens Ward, 2001
Tetraponera crassiuscula (Emery, 1900)
Tetraponera difficilis (Emery, 1900)
Tetraponera extenuata Ward, 2001
Tetraponera modesta (Smith, 1860)
Tetraponera nigra (Jerdon, 1851)
Tetraponera nitida (Smith, 1860)
Tetraponera nodosa Ward, 2001
Tetraponera notabilis Ward, 2001
Tetraponera pilosa (Smith, 1858)
Tetraponera rufonigra (Jerdon, 1851)

See also
List of ant genera
List of beetles of Thailand
List of butterflies of Thailand

References

Thailand
Thailand
Ants